Őrhalom is a village in Nógrád County, Hungary with 967 inhabitants as of 2015.

References

Populated places in Nógrád County